Rotherham United Football Club is an association football club based in Rotherham, South Yorkshire. The club was formed in 1925 as a merger between Rotherham Town and Rotherham County when it was decided that having two professional clubs in the town was not sustainable. After the merger, the club was elected to play in the Football League Third Division North. United played in the Third Division North until 1950–51, when they were champions of the division and were promoted to the Second Division. During their first spell in the Second Division the club reached the fifth round of the FA Cup twice and were runners up in the inaugural Football League Cup, which is the furthest they have reached in these competitions. Their furthest Football League Trophy run saw the club win the competition twice, in the 1995–96 season defeating Shrewsbury Town 2–1 in the final; and in the 2021–22 season defeating Sutton United 4–2 after extra time in the final.

As at the end of 2021–22, the club's first team has remained in the English Football League since its formation. Their highest finish came in 1954–55 when they finished in third place in the Second Division, missing out on promotion to the top division only on goal average. In total the club has spent 26 seasons in the second tier of the English football league system, 47 in the third and 13 in the fourth. Rotherham has qualified for four Football League play-offs, in 1998–99 they lost in the Third Division semi-final to Leyton Orient, in 2009–10 they reached the League Two final but lost 3–2 to Dagenham & Redbridge, in 2013–14 they reached the League One final and defeated Leyton Orient in a penalty shoot-out to gain promotion the Football League Championship, and in 2017–18 they again reached the League One final and defeated Shrewsbury Town 2–1 to gain promotion the EFL Championship. The table details their achievements in first-team competitions for each completed season since their first appearance in the Football League in 1925–26.

Key

Key to divisions
 Division 1 – Football League First Division
 Division 2 – Football League Second Division
 Division 3 – Football League Third Division
 Division 3N – Football League Third Division North 
 Division 4 – Football League Fourth Division
 Championship – Football League Championship
 League 1 – Football League One
 League 2 – Football League Two

Key to rounds
 PR – Preliminary Round
 GS – Group Stage
 R1 – First Round, etc.
 QF – Quarter-finals
 SF – Semi-finals
 F(N) – Runner-up for the Northern section
 RU – Runner-up
 W – Winner

Key to positions and symbols
  – Champions
  – Runners-up
  – Promoted
  – Relegated

Seasons

Notes

References
General
 
 
 

Specific

Seasons
 
Rotherham United